, also known as System Sacom Sales Corp., is a Japanese company which sells electronic devices. They are more notable for their past, in which they developed video games. In the 1980s, they mainly published games for computers, but they changed focus to home consoles in the 1990s. Its head office is located in Tokyo.

Sacom had particular success with their  series, which had tremendous effect within the sound novel and visual novel genres. In the series, they tried to create a fusion of sound and the written word.

When the Famicom Disk System was popular, Sacom was a member of DOG (Disk Original Group), of which Square was a prominent member.

Currently, all System Sacom IPs are owned by D4 Enterprise.

Games list 
Note --- This is taken directly from Japanese Wikipedia

For computer
 DOME (PC-8801 / PC-9801 / X1 / FM-7 / MSX2 / MZ-2500 / X68000)
 Shati (シャティ) (PC-8801)
 Soft de Hard na Monogatari (ソフトでハードな物語) (PC-9801 / X68000)
 Soft de Hard na Monogatari 2 (ソフトでハードな物語2) (PC-9801 / X68000)
 38 man Kiro no Kokū (38万キロの虚空) (PC-9801 / X68000 / FM-TOWNS)
 Yami no Ketsuzoku (闇の血族)(X68000)
 Yami no Ketsuzoku -Kanketsuhen- (闇の血族　-完結編-) (X68000)
 Yami no Ketsuzoku Special (闇の血族Special) (FM-TOWNS)
 Providence (プロヴィデンス) (PC-8801)
 Märchen Veil (メルヘンヴェール) (PC-9801 / PC-8801 / PC-8801mk II SR / X1 / FM-7 / MZ-2500 / MSX2)
 Märchen Veil 2 (メルヘンヴェールII) (PC-9801)
 Metal Sight (メタルサイト) (X68000)
 Euphory (ユーフォリー) (X1)
 Valna (ヴァルナ) (PC-8801)
 Yūreikun (幽霊君) (MSX2)
 Valiant (ヴァリアント) (PC-9801)
 Moon Ball (ムーンボール) (PC-9801)
 Brown Zuran (ブラウンズラン)
 Zone (ゾーン) (PC-9801)
 Highway Star (ハイウェイスター) (PC-9801)
 EVOLUTION (FM-TOWNS)
 Tokimeki Memorial: Forever With You (ときめきメモリアル ～forever with you～) (WINDOWS 95)
 Tokimeki Memorial Taisen: Puzzle Dama (ときめきメモリアル 対戦ぱずるだま) (WINDOWS 95)
 Gradius Deluxe Pack (グラディウス ＤＥＬＵＸＥ ＰＡＣＫ) (WINDOWS 95)
 Henry Explorers (ヘンリーエクスプローラーズ) (WINDOWS 95)
 Gensō Suikoden (幻想水滸伝) (WINDOWS 95)
 Vandal Hearts (ヴァンダルハーツ) (WINDOWS 95)

For console
 Grandslam Tennis Tournament '92 (グランドスラムテニストーナメント'92)（MD）
 Yumemi Yakata no Monogatari (夢見館の物語)（MCD）
 Gekitotsu Dangan Jidōsha Kessen: Battle Mobile (激突弾丸自動車決戦 バトルモービル)（SFC）
 Smart Ball (ジェリーボーイ)（SFC）
 Shinsetsu Yumemi Yakata: Tobira no Oku ni Dareka ga... (真説・夢見館 扉の奥に誰かが...)（SS）
 Gekkamugentan Torico (月花霧幻譚~TORICO~)/Lunacy（SS）
 Jikū Tantei DD (時空探偵DD)（SS / PS）
 Jikū Tantei DD2 (時空探偵DD2)（PS）
 Eurasia Express Satsujin Jiken (ユーラシアエクスプレス殺人事件)（PS）
 Are! Mo Kore? Mo Momotarō (あれ!も これ?も 桃太郎)（PS）
 Gale Racer (ゲイルレーサー)（SS）
 Astronōka (アストロノーカ)（PS）
 Iblard -Laputa no Kaeru Machi- (イバラード 〜ラピュタの孵る街〜)（PS）
 Running High (ランニング・ハイ)（PS）
 Cyber Daisenryaku (サイバー大戦略)（PS）
 Deep Fear (ディープフィアー) (SS)

References

Software companies based in Tokyo
Video game companies of Japan
Video game development companies